Stolzia may refer to:
 Stolzia (insect), a genus of grasshoppers in the family Acrididae
 Stolzia (plant), a genus of plants in the family Orchidaceae